Kaang Bong-Kiun was born in Jeju-do, South Korea, on November 21, 1961. He is a professor of neuroscience in the Department of Biological Sciences of Seoul National University. He is a Fellow of the Korean Academy of Science and Technology.

Education
He received his bachelor's degree in 1984 and his M.S. in 1986 from the Department of Microbiology, Seoul National University. During his M.S. course, he developed an interest in molecular neuroscience, particularly, in how memory is stored in the brain at the molecular level. He then went to Columbia University where he was supervised by a Nobel laureate Eric R. Kandel for his Ph.D. course and a brief postdoctoral study. He investigated the molecular mechanisms of learning and memory using a simple animal, the marine snail Aplysia. Under the supervision of Dr. Kandel, he received his Ph.D. in 1992. Kaang's Ph.D. thesis, which was entitled, “Studies of Long-Term Facilitation Using Gene Transfer Methods,” introduced the development of the gene delivery system in Aplysia neurons. He continued his research as a postdoctoral research fellow at the Center for Neurobiology and Behavior at Columbia University until 1994, when he was appointed to a faculty position at Seoul National University, Korea.

Work
Kaang's studies have mainly focused on the molecular mechanisms of learning and memory. In his Ph.D. course, he developed the microinjection-based gene transfer method for Aplysia neurons. This technology opened up a new era of molecular studies on the memory mechanisms in Aplysia, as well as of functional studies of receptors, signaling molecules, and ion channels, which play key roles in neuronal functions. He revealed that serotonin-induced transcription requires the protein kinase-A-mediated phosphorylation of the cAMP-response element-binding protein (CREB). Moreover, he found that multiple pulses of serotonin stimulate gene expression that is mediated by the cAMP-response element (CRE).

He continued to study Aplysia when he set up his own laboratory in Korea. He started by establishing an expressed sequence tag database and transcriptome analyses of Aplysia. He identified a serotonin receptor involved in learning-related synaptic facilitation in Aplysia. In addition, he was successful in finding the novel signaling molecules ApLLP, CAMAP, ApPDE4, and ApAUF1, which are involved in long-term facilitation. With his colleagues at Columbia University, he delineated the molecular networks of the molecules that interplay with other regulatory molecules, such as ApCAM, CREB1, CREB2, C/EBP, and ApAF. Furthermore, Kaang reported that, by genetically controlling the expression of these key molecules in specific neurons, he could induce long-term facilitation that lasted days with a single pulse of serotonin that normally induces short-term facilitation that lasts only several minutes.

In parallel with these studies in Aplysia, Kaang has expanded his research field to more complex mammalian models. Combining molecular, electrophysiological, and behavioral experimental tools, he began to explore the mechanisms of learning and memory in mice. One of the major findings from his group was proving the importance of synaptic protein degradation in memory reorganization. He found that postsynaptic proteins were degraded in the hippocampus by polyubiquitination after the retrieval of contextual fear memory. Moreover, the infusion of proteasome inhibitors into the CA1 of the hippocampus immediately after retrieval prevented anisomycin-induced memory impairment and the extinction of fear memory. Another major finding from his laboratory was the importance of a kinase, PI3Kγ, in long-term depression and behavioral flexibility.

Recently, he has been expanding his interests to neurological symptoms such as pain and itch and psychiatric disorders, such as autism. One of his major investigations regarding pain was proving that PKMζ, a molecule known for its role in the maintenance of long-term potentiation and long-term memory, is important in maintaining chronic pain in the anterior cingulate cortex. In collaboration with Min Zhuo from the University of Toronto, he showed that the phosphorylation of PKMζ was increased in a neuropathic pain model in the anterior cingulate cortex. In addition, they showed that chronic pain behavior was alleviated by treating mice with the PKMζ blocker ZIP, suggesting that this could be a new therapeutic target for treating chronic pain.

Recently, in collaboration with M.G. Lee and E. Kim, he has demonstrated that NMDAR-dependent synaptic plasticity in the hippocampus is impaired in a mouse model of autism, the Shank2 knockout. When they treated the mice with drugs that upregulate NMDA receptor function, the impairment was recovered, suggesting the possibility that these drugs could be used for treating patients with autism in the future.
 
Kaang has published 110 research and review articles in a number of journals, including Nature, Science, Cell, Neuron, and Nature Neuroscience. He is currently the Editor-in-Chief of Molecular Brain. Kaang received the Life Science Award from the Korean Society for Molecular and Cellular Biology (2008). He was awarded the Donghun Award from the Korean Society for Biochemistry and Molecular Biology (2012). He won the Kyung-Ahm Prize (2012, $180,000) from the Kyung Ahm Foundation.

Kaang is currently a National Honor Scientist in Korea and continues to passionately unravel the mechanisms of learning and memory and related brain disorders.

Awards
The Best Research Award, College of Natural Sciences, Seoul National University (2007)
Excellent Research Scientist, Korea Ministry of Science and Technology (2007)
Life Science Award, Korean Society for Molecular and Cellular Biology (2008) 
Fellow of the Korean Academy of Science and Technology (2010)
Donghun Award, Korean Society for Biochemistry and Molecular Biology (2012)
National Honor Scientist Program, National Research Foundation, Korea (2012)
Kyung-Ahm Prize (2012)
National Academy of Sciences Award (2016)
Ho-Am Prize in Science, Chemistry and Life Sciences (2021)

References

Publications

External links
Bong-Kiun Kaang’s lab

South Korean scientists
Academic staff of Seoul National University
Seoul National University alumni
1961 births
Living people
People from Jeju Province
Recipients of the Ho-Am Prize in Science